The Oman Botanic Garden is a development of the Diwan of Royal Court in Oman, with unique plants, landscapes, and cultural traditions of Oman. The gardens are located on 423 hectares in Al Khoud, about 20 kilometers from the capital Muscat. The garden showcases all of the native plant species of Oman in a series of man-made naturalistic habitats from the dry deserts to the rich monsoon cloud forests. The garden also showcases the traditionally cultivated crops, with information on how plants are used by the people of Oman. It presents an opportunity for visitors to experience the flora and vegetation of Oman while learning about the agricultural heritage, cultural traditions, and hospitality of the country.

Concept 
The design concept is based on four basic principles:

 The native flora is represented in naturalistic habitats.
 The garden reflects and honors Oman's botanical heritage.
 The garden demonstrates a sustainable approach.
 The displays are interactive to provide a modern form of education and interpretation.
At the time of development, the Oman Botanic Garden was the first botanical garden to display the extensive flora of an entire region. 

The garden is the largest botanical garden in the Arabian Peninsula and one of the largest in the world. The garden consists of the following key components: nursery, visitor center, research center, field study center, outdoor habitat gardens, northern mountain biome, southern mountain biome, and nature reserve area.

The Oman Botanic Garden project is built upon a foundation of environmental sensitivity and sustainability. The project is built within the limits of a large nature reserve, and as such a “tread lightly” approach is followed, both in concept and in construction.

As a part of its main objective, Oman Botanic Garden is helping to create a more sustainable world, throughout its design, construction and operation.  The project is applying for certification for some of the buildings through the Leadership in Energy and Environmental Design (LEED), operated by the US Green Building Council. This places stringent criteria on energy efficiency, sourcing and use of materials, minimizing the use of resources, and communicating best practice.

Flora and vegetation of Oman
The Sultanate of Oman in the southern Arabian Peninsula is mainly characterised by arid habitats, with much of the region occupied by sand dunes or rock and gravel desert. However, and often in stark contrast to the deserts, the country also contains a seasonal cloud forest, open juniper woodlands and other habitats supporting high species diversity with many endemic plants.

Oman lies in the transition zone between the Holarctic and Palaeotropical kingdoms, as well as between subtropical and tropical climate zones. This position is reflected by the presence of plant species from several biogeographical regions as demonstrated by the comparatively high number of vascular plants in Oman.

A period of intensified botanical research in Oman has taken place over the last two decades. There has been good progress extending our knowledge of the flora of Oman, resulting in the description of 103 new range-restricted species since 1980 and the documentation of new records for the country (Patzelt, 2014).

However, detailed studies of the vegetation and plant communities are still scarce and current knowledge ranges from no documentation at all to brief descriptions of the vegetation types or to characterisation of the vegetation units by their complete floristic composition and arranged in a hierarchical system of floristic similarity. Data are also lacking regarding the population parameters and ecology of individual plant species.

Oman has a total of 191 range-restricted species, representing 13.6% of the total flora (Patzelt, 2014). This high proportion of range-restricted species (endemics, near endemics and regional endemics) in the Sultanate can be explained by a unique combination of ecological factors that restricted the range of species in the past. Endemics are found in all vegetation types throughout the country. However, some habitats are particularly rich in range-restricted species and are of special interest, encompassing sites of maximum biodiversity. Significant species-rich habitats include the monsoon-affected mountains in southern Oman, the northern Hajar mountains, and the coastal areas of the central desert; these areas represent local centres of plant endemism.

History and development of Oman Botanic Garden
Following a Royal Decree in 2006 by His Majesty Sultan Qaboos bin Said al Said, the Oman Botanic Garden project was initiated. The scale and complexity of the project is such that the design and construction work has been divided into multiple phases. Construction of the Oman Botanic Garden started in 2007 with the construction of a native plants nursery on site. The on-site nursery was constructed in 2008 and has been fully functional since then.  The nursery now houses one of the largest documented collections of Arabian plants in the world, with ca. 70,000 plants in cultivation. The garden also houses a seed bank with currently ca. 5 million seeds. Most seeds are collected from the wild, with verification levels close to 100%.

Many of the architectural, landscape architectural and infrastructure components of Oman Botanic Garden are currently under design or construction, at varying levels of completion, while the plant collection is being grown. The Oman Botanic Garden is not only Oman's leading institution of National Plant Collections, but is already regarded as one of the world's most interesting botanic gardens.

Oman Botanic Garden staff
The current staff structure consists of five departments: Botany and Conservation, Living Collections, Education and Communication, Operations, and Corporate Services. To date, the garden employs 80 staff, including four international experts and 76 Omani nationals.

Several of the team are recruits from the local village, enabling the involvement of the local community with the project and helping to ensure that the benefits and information about the project are shared - an important aspect of the project's sustainability focus.

Plants collections in Oman Botanic Garden
The plant collections of the Oman Botanic Garden include living plants in the nursery, seeds in the seed bank and preserved plants in the herbarium. The plants currently grown in the nursery represent the largest scientific and documented collection of Arabian Plants on earth. Only very few of the plants of Oman have been propagated or cultivated before, so the work of the nursery is greatly increasing the knowledge and understanding of the country's flora.

The Oman Botanic Garden botanist and horticulture teams collect plants as seeds and cuttings through regular field trips; hundreds of expeditions have taken placeto all areas and habitats of the country to collect, monitor and record invaluable data about Oman's plants and habitats.

The majority of the native plants of Oman which will be planted in the Oman Botanic Garden are not available commercially. Therefore, the botany team has spent thousands of days on field expeditions to collect seed and other plant material to build up the collection. Seeds are collected and the plants are propagated for the first time ever at the Oman Botanic Garden nursery.

The overall vision of the habitat gardens is to represent a specific habitat at its best. A habitat design is not a formal design, but rather provides a true representation of the plants in their natural environments.  The native plants of Oman will also be used in the amenity areas of the garden, outside of the habitats, to showcase the design potential of using native Omani plants in the landscape.

Research in Oman Botanic Garden
Oman Botanic Garden conducts active research in the areas of flora and vegetation of Oman, propagation and cultivation of native plant species, ethnobotany, plant pests and diseases, and designing with native species.
The garden helps to protect the plant diversity of Oman through botanical and horticultural research and conservation. 
The Oman Botanic Garden Herbarium currently 1800 holds plant vouchers, which are arranged systematically. The herbarium is open to visitors.
The garden will also conduct plant genetics research once the research facilities are constructed and ready to use.

The Oman Botanic Garden will form a key part of Oman's response to the Global Strategy for Plant Conservation, part of the Convention on Biological Diversity.

Education and communication in Oman Botanic Garden
Environmental education is at the heart of the garden and one of its key functions. Through the work of the Oman Botanic Gardens, visitors will be encouraged to respect and care for the country's indigenous natural environment and learn more about the fascinating cultural connection that exists between plants and people and value all that Oman stands for.

Oman Botanic Garden currently develops tests and runs school programmes, programmes for university students, and for other visitor groups. Course material is being developed and further refined. The garden works together with the relevant Ministries, to ensure that the programme of the garden ties in the country's curricula.

A temporary visitor centre is used for pre-booked visiting groups and school parties.  
The garden's website can be accessed at www.omanbotanicgarden.com.

Global botanic garden context
There are currently 2,200 botanic gardens known in the world in nearly 150 countries, but there are very few in the Middle East and South-West Asia, although the area is home to an estimated 60,000 plant species.

The flora of the Arabian Peninsula has so far been poorly represented in any botanic garden on a global scale. Botanic gardens worldwide do not adequately reflect the Arabian plant diversity and number of collections is the smallest of all botanic garden living plant material.

Oman has a rich and unique botanical heritage and has taken regional leadership in environmental issues. The garden will be the first in the world to grow only the native species of a region, planted in scientifically accurate, natural habitat gardens. The respect and value for plant diversity conservation fostered by the Oman Botanic Garden represents a major global step forward in global plant conservation efforts.

Further reading
 Al-Abbasi TM, Al-Farhan A, Al-Khulaidi AW, Hall M, Llewellyn OA, Miller AG, Patzelt A (2010). Important Plant Areas in the Arabian Peninsula. Edinburgh Journal of Botany 67(1): 25-35.
 Brinkmann K, Patzelt A, Dickhoefer U, Schlecht E, Buerkert A (2009). Vegetation pattern and diversity along an altitudinal and a grazing gradient in the Jabal Al Akhdarmountain range of northern Oman. - Journal of Arid Environment, 74: 1035-1045.
 Ghazanfar, SA & Fisher M (1998). (Eds.) Vegetation of the Arabian Peninsula.– Kluwer Academic Publishers.
 Hildebrandt A & EAEltahir (2006).Forest at the edge: Seasonal cloud forest in Oman creates its own ecological niche. - Geophysical Research Letters, 33.
 Luedeling E &Buerkert A. (2009).Typology of oases in northern Oman based on Landsat and SRTM imagery and geological survey data. - Remote Sensing of Environment, 112: 1181-1195.
 Mandaville JP (1984). Studies in the Flora of Arabia XI: some historical and geographical aspects of a principle floristic frontier.- Notes Royal Botanic Garden Edinburgh 42(1): 1-15.
 Miller AG & Morris M (1988).Plants of Dhofar- The southern region of Oman. Traditional, Economic and Medicinal Uses.-Office for the Adviser for Conservation of the Environment, Diwan of Royal Court.
 Miller AG & Cope TA (1996): Flora of the Arabian Peninsula and Socotra, Vol. 1. - Edinburgh.
 Miller AG&NybergJA (1991).Patterns of endemism in Arabia. - Flora etVegetatio Mundi, 9: 263-279.
 Patzelt A (2011).The Themedaquadrivalvis tall-grass savannah of Oman at the crossroad between Africa and Asia. - Edinburgh Journal of Botany, 68(2): 301-319.
 Patzelt A (2014).Oman Plant Red Data Book.- Oman Botanic Garden, Diwan of Royal Court, Muscat, Oman.
 Patzelt A (2015).Photographic Field Guide to the plants of the Western Hajar mountains, Sultanate of Oman, with a complete checklist of vascular plant species. - Sultan Qaboos University, Muscat, Oman.
 Patzelt A (2015). Synopsis of the Flora and Vegetation of Oman, with Special Emphasis on Patterns of Plant Endemism.-Abhandlungen der Braunschweigischen Wissenschaftlichen Gesellschaft, 282-317.
 Patzelt A, Morris LM, Al Farsi K, Spalton A (2009). The Oman Botanic Garden (2): Collections Policy, Nursery Construction, Expanded Plant Production and Initial Tree Translocation. Sibbaldia 7: 83-97
 Patzelt A, Morris L, Al Harthi L, Al Rashdi I, Spalton A (2008). The Oman Botanic Garden (1): The Vision, early plant collections and propagation. Sibbaldia 6: 41-77.
 Patzelt A, Harrison T, KneesSG&AlHarthy L (2014): Studies in the Flora of Arabia XXXI: New records from the Sultanate of Oman.- Edinburgh Journal of Botany, 70(2): 1-20.
 Patzelt A, Lansdown RV, &KneesSG (2015).The status and distribution of wetland-dependent plants in the Arabian Peninsula.- IUCN publication.
 Pickering H, Patzelt A (2008). Field Guide to the Wild Plants of Oman. Kew Publishing, Royal Botanic Gardens Kew. 281 pages.
 Richardson, N., Dorrs, M (2004).The Craft Heritage of Oman.-  London: Motivate Publishers.
 White F&LeonardJ (1991).Phytogeographical links between Africa and Southwest Asia. -Flora etVegetatio Mundi, 9: 229-246

References

Gardens in Oman
Botanical gardens